Trigger Tom is a 1935 American Western film directed by Harry S. Webb and starring Tom Tyler, Al St. John and Bernadene Hayes.

Cast
 Tom Tyler as Tom Hunter
 Al St. John as Stub Macey 
 William Gould as Mose Jeckyl 
 John Elliott as Nord Jergenson 
 Bernadene Hayes as Dorothy Jergenson 
 Bud Osborne as Scarface 
 Lloyd Ingraham as Pop Slater 
 Hal Taliaferro as Sam Slater

References

Bibliography
 Pitts, Michael R. Poverty Row Studios, 1929–1940: An Illustrated History of 55 Independent Film Companies, with a Filmography for Each. McFarland & Company, 2005.

External links
 

1935 films
1935 Western (genre) films
1930s English-language films
American Western (genre) films
Films directed by Harry S. Webb
Reliable Pictures films
American black-and-white films
1930s American films